Lincoln High School is a historic school building at 20-26 Council Street in Sumter, South Carolina.  A relatively modern structure, it was built in 1937 to serve the community's African-American student population, which it did until the schools were integrated in 1969.  The school also served as a focal point for the African American community as a place for civic meetings and social events.

The building was listed on the National Register of Historic Places in 2015.  As of 2018 it is the Historical Lincoln Center.

See also
National Register of Historic Places listings in Sumter County, South Carolina

References

School buildings on the National Register of Historic Places in South Carolina
School buildings completed in 1937
Buildings and structures in Sumter County, South Carolina
National Register of Historic Places in Sumter County, South Carolina